Founded in 1976 by Michael Foster, Coastal Air Transport is a St. Croix, U.S. Virgin Islands based airline that provides service to several Caribbean destinations including St. Eustatius, Nevis, Dominica, Anguilla and St. Kitts. Coastal Air operates Cessna 402 and 404 nine passenger airplanes.

Destinations
Dominica-Canefield
Anguilla
Saint Croix
Nevis
Saint Kitts
Sint Eustatius
Sint Maarten

Fleet 

 the Coastal Air fleet includes:

References

Airlines established in 1976
Airlines of the United States Virgin Islands
1976 establishments in the United States Virgin Islands